Sean Foley may refer to:

Seán Foley (born 1949), Irish sportsman
Sean Foley (director) (born 1964), British theatre director, actor and writer
Sean Foley (golf instructor) (born 1974), Canadian golf instructor who coaches several PGA Tour players
Sean Foley (ethnographer), Irish ethnographer
Sean Foley (film editor), American film editor, whose credits include The Slumber Party Massacre
Sean Foley, American musician of Bright Eyes

See also
Sean Reid-Foley (born 1995), American baseball player
Shaun Foley (born 1986), Australian rugby league footballer